You Gotta Sin to Get Saved is the second album by the American singer-songwriter Maria McKee, released in 1993. The album includes two Van Morrison covers and a take on Goffin/King's "I Can't Make It Alone". The first single was "I'm Gonna Soothe You", which peaked at No. 35 on the UK Singles Chart.

McKee, while promoting her third album, stated that she was unsatisfied with You Gotta Sin to Get Saved.

Critical reception

Trouser Press wrote: "Like much of this amazing, unexpected album, McKee splits her convictions between the music and the words, sinning and saving herself in a fission explosion that blasts into the spirit of rock'n'roll." The Guardian concluded that "languid backing by California session pros Jim Keltner, Benmont Tench et al, does nothing to spice up Maria's clear voice, or tumbleweed 'n' dust affairs."

Track listing
"I'm Gonna Soothe You" (Bruce Brody, Marvin Etzioni, McKee) – 3:36
"My Lonely Sad Eyes" (Van Morrison) – 2:41
"My Girlhood Among the Outlaws" (McKee) – 3:44
"Only Once" (McKee) – 4:03
"I Forgive You" (Sam Brown, McKee) – 5:06
"I Can't Make It Alone" (Gerry Goffin, Carole King) – 3:38
"Precious Time" (Gary Louris, Mark Olson) – 3:35
"The Way Young Lovers Do"  (Van Morrison) – 3:29
"Why Wasn't I More Grateful (When Life Was Sweet)" (Brody, Etzioni, McKee) – 5:05
"You Gotta Sin to Get Saved" (Brody, Sam Dogg, Etzioni, McKee) – 5:49

Personnel
Maria McKee – piano, rhythm guitar, vocals
Jon Auer – background vocals
Bruce Brody – organ, piano, Hammond organ, background vocals, handclapping, Wurlitzer
David Campbell – conductor
George Drakoulias – drums
Marvin Etzioni – bass guitar, guitar, mandolin, background vocals, handclapping
Don Heffington – percussion, drums, background vocals, handclapping
The Jayhawks
Jim Keltner – drums
Dale Lavi – handclapping
Gary Louris – electric guitar, background vocals, handclapping
The Memphis Horns – horns
Spyder Mittleman – saxophone
Brendan O'Brien – bass
Mark Olson – acoustic guitar, guitar, harmonica, background vocals, handclapping
Nicol Sponberg – handclapping
Ken Stringfellow – background vocals
Benmont Tench – organ, piano, Hammond organ, background vocals, handclapping, Wurlitzer, vox organ
Mike Utley – piano
Don Was – bass
Julia Waters – background vocals
Maxine Waters – background vocals
Edna Wright – background vocals

Production
Producer: George Drakoulias
Engineers: Brendan O'Brien, Thom Panunzio, Martin Schmelze
Assistant engineers: Doug Boehm, Jim Champagne
Mixing: David Bianco, Martin Schmelze
Mastering: Stephen Marcussen
Arranger: David Campbell
Horn arrangements: The Memphis Horns
Art direction: Janet Wolshom
Director: Robin Sloane
Photography: Marvin Etzioni

Charts
Album – Billboard (North America)

References

Maria McKee albums
1993 albums
Geffen Records albums
Albums produced by George Drakoulias
Albums arranged by David Campbell (composer)